William L. Flannery was an American bridge player, born July 29, 1932 in Pittsburgh, PA. He died on October 10, 2000 in Bakersfield, California. He was an outstanding high school basketball player, leading St. James High School to the 1950 Class B Pennsylvania Catholic State Championship.

Flannery invented the Flannery 2 bridge bidding convention.

Bridge accomplishments

Wins
Flannery had approximately 50 regional wins including Upper New York State Open Teams in 1963 and 1965 and the Mid-Atlantic Fall Master Pairs 1967

Runners-up
 North American Bridge Championships (3)
 Reisinger (1) 1963 
 Nail Life Master Open Pairs (1) 1967 
Mixed Pairs (1) 1968

Notes

American contract bridge players